Andy or Andrew Holt may refer to:

 Andrew D. Holt (1904–1987), president of the University of Tennessee
 Andy Holt (1910s and 1920s footballer), English footballer
 Andy Holt (footballer, born 1978), English footballer
 Andy Holt (Hollyoaks), fictional character in the Channel 4 British television soap opera Hollyoaks
 Andrew Holt (judge) (1855–1948), American jurist
 Andy Holt (politician) (born 1981), politician in the Tennessee House of Representatives
 Andy Holt (businessman), British businessman and owner of Accrington Stanley FC